K256 or K-256 may refer to:

K-256 (Kansas highway), a state highway in Kansas
K256AS, a relay transmitter